Travelling North is a 1987 Australian film directed by Carl Schultz and starring Leo McKern, Julia Blake, Graham Kennedy, and Henri Szeps. Based on an original 1979 play of the same name by David Williamson, it is one of Williamson's favourite movies based on his works. The act of "travelling north" as used in the title, in the context of the southern hemisphere in which the film and its original play are set, denotes transitioning from the colder, business-dominated southern regions of the Australian continent to the notionally more relaxed and warmer subtropical or tropical northern regions such as northern New South Wales (in the play) and ultimately, far north Queensland.

Synopsis
Frank, a newly retired, sometimes bad-tempered civil engineer and his partner Frances, a good-natured divorcee some 15 years his junior, decide to live together for the first time and relocate upon his retirement from cold, busy Melbourne (home of Frances' two married daughters) to a modest but apparently paradise-like beachside home in a small town in the tropics of far north Queensland. The film follows their journey through Frank's declining health, his immoderate outbursts tempered with occasional acts of kindness and self-realization, his initial neglect of Frances' own needs, the contrast between their past big city and new small town surroundings, and their sometimes fraught, sometimes comic interactions with Freddy, their ex-serviceman neighbour and Saul, the long suffering local doctor, who eventually become their friends and providers of emotional support, to its foreshadowed, moderately peaceful, ending for Frank and cusp of another new beginning in beautiful surroundings for Frances.

Play
The David Williamson play Travelling North premiered in 1979, the year that Williamson moved from Melbourne to Sydney. Williamson says the inspiration for the play came soon after he met his second wife Kristin and she took him up to the Central Coast of New South Wales to visit her mother Hope. Hope had recently remarried an older man called Wilkie. Williamson:
There was more than a little hint of disapproval from her two daughters about the new liaison, which I used in the play, but I found them an inspiring couple. Wilkie was a ferociously intelligent man, a former electrical engineer and ex-communist with pronounced opinions on just about everything. Hope was gentler but with a wonderful quality of perception and understanding. They both impressed me and, some years later, the image of them both living in a verdant, sunlit subtropical paradise re-entered my mind and became Travelling North. In fact, by the time I wrote it, Wilkie had died. I asked Hope whether I could write the play and she trusted me and was most cooperative. She told me anecdotes about a busybody neighbour who had annoyed the hell out of Wilkie and a long-suffering doctor who had to answer Wilkie's probing questions about the quality of treatment he was delivering. These characters found their way into the story. I think Hope genuinely liked the play, but my wife Kristin and her sister were a little less enthusiastic, particularly when Frank, in the play, refers to them as "Goneril and Regan".
"This play was not to do with me, and there was no 'me' character in it," he later said. "It was a dispassionate – hopefully – observation of a journey we all must make. I tried to make it as truthful, emotionally, as I could."

In his 1980 introduction to the published version of the play, academic Philip Parsons writes that "Scenes are to be compared, connected, slotted together in a growing structure that will be complete only with the last scene of all. No form could more perfectly express the search for meaning in a life shortly to end, which is the theme of Travelling North." Elsewhere in the same introduction, Parsons writes: "Travelling north, Frances needs to escape from her own sense of guilt. Frank, untroubled by guilt, feels he needs to get away from the pressure of people to examine his life for its meaning. They both have a lot to do."

The film was not made until eight years later, with Williamson adapting his own play into a script.

Production
Ben Gannon optioned film rights to the play and hired Leo McKern to play the lead. It was intended that Michael Blakemore direct but after casting was completed he dropped out and was replaced by Carl Schultz. Warren Mitchell was originally cast as the local doctor but was replaced by Henri Szeps, who transitioned his part from playing the same role in the original Sydney production of the stage play.

The film was shot in Port Douglas, Queensland, in July and August 1986. Much of the superb atmosphere of the film was created by the choice of music - the heart-rending slow movement from Wolfgang Amadeus Mozart's String Quintet No. 4 - which was used repeatedly throughout.

The northern location, and the tone of the ending for Frances were changed in the eight years between the release of the play and the film. In the play, the couple set up home not in tropical Queensland but in the sub-tropics at Tweed Heads in northern New South Wales, local characters such as Freddy and Saul also reside there, and it is made clear that upon Frank's death, Frances intends to continue her journey of self-realization by "travelling north" further. In the film, Frank and Frances "travel north" together all the way to tropical Queensland's Port Douglas at the outset (virtually as far as the road goes in that direction, and some 1,600 kilometers/1,000 miles further north than Tweed Heads in reality) and the northern-located action is all set there. In both cases, Frank in his posthumously-opened letter suggests that Frances would be better off returning to her family in Melbourne than staying around and getting entangled with further old persons ("old crocks", a veiled reference to Freddy and/or Saul) locally. In the film, the last that the viewer sees of Frances is in the garden of the far north Queensland home that she and Frank have created together, smiling, as if to convey the impression that she may already have found her desired destination.

Critical reception
Critical reviews of the movie were largely positive, with one or two notable exceptions. On www.rogerebert.com, Roger Ebert gave the movie 3.5 stars, stating:

On the other hand, Hal Hinson, in The Washington Post, wrote:

Robert Horton, on "What a Feeling", wrote:

On the Urban CineFile, reviewer Andrew L. Urban wrote:

On the Internet Movie Database (IMDb), the film is given an overall rating of 6.9/10 based on 297 user ratings (as at July 2020).

Awards
At the AFI Awards the film won the categories Best Actor in a Lead Role (Leo McKern) and Best Adapted Screenplay (David Williamson). Julia Blake was nominated. Montréal World Film Festival awarded the Best Actor award to Leo McKern.

Box office
Travelling North grossed $1,464,000 at the box office in Australia, which is equivalent to $2,942,640 in 2009 dollars.

See also
Cinema of Australia

References

External links

"'TRAVELLING NORTH' A SWEET, MEMORABLE LOVE STORY", review by Roger Hurlburt for the South Florida Sun Sentinel
Travelling North at the Australian screen website
Travelling North (play) study guide at www.enotes.com

1987 films
1987 drama films
Australian drama films
Australian films based on plays
Films based on works by David Williamson
Films set in Melbourne
Films set in Queensland
Films shot in Queensland
Films directed by Carl Schultz
Films scored by Alan John
1980s English-language films